Airkenya Express is an airline based in Nairobi, Kenya. It operates domestic scheduled and charter services, as well as scheduled flights to Tanzania. Its main base is Wilson Airport, Nairobi.

History 

Airkenya Express was formed and started operations in 1987 from the merger of Air Kenya and Sunbird Aviation. The two companies had over 20 years of general aviation experience in East Africa. Airkenya Aviation became Airkenya Express in January 2007. The airline is wholly owned by a Kenyan-controlled consortium and has 165 employees. It carried 100,000 passengers in 2014, as against 120,000 in 2013.

AirKenya has two wholly owned subsidiaries: Regional Air Services in Tanzania launched in 1997 and AeroLink in Uganda launched in 2012.

Services 
Airkenya Express Limited operates to the following airports (as of July 2021):

Domestic scheduled destinations: 
Amboseli (Amboseli Airport) 
Lewa Downs (Lewa Airport)
Maasai Mara (Keekorok, Kichwa, Musiara, Ngerende, Olekiombo, Serena, Shikar and Siana airstrips.)
Meru (Mulika Lodge Airport)
Nairobi-Wilson
Nanyuki (Nanyuki Airport)
 Samburu (Samburu Airport)

International scheduled destinations: 
Kilimanjaro, Tanzania (Kilimanjaro International Airport)

Accidents and incidents
In February 1992, Douglas DC-3C 5Y-BBN was written off at an airstrip in the Maasai Mara. The aircraft was scrapped in situ in 1993.

Fleet 
The Airkenya fleet consists of the following aircraft (as of August 2017):

References

External links

Airlines of Kenya
Airlines established in 1987
Companies based in Nairobi
Kenyan companies established in 1987